The 2007–08 football season was Plymouth Argyle Football Club's 39th season in the Football League Championship, the second division of English football, and their 103rd as a professional club.

This article shows statistics of individual players for the football club Plymouth Argyle. It also lists all matches played by the club in the 2007–08 season.

Review and events

This is a list of the significant events to occur at the club during the 2007–08 season, presented in chronological order. This list does not include transfers, which are listed in the transfers section below, or match results, which are in the results section.

5 July: Argyle target Kevin Gallen, who was previously on loan to Argyle, signs with MK Dons.
5 July: Gary Sawyer signs a three-year contract extension, keeping him at the club until summer 2010.
20 July: New kit is announced.
23 July: Argyle arrive in Austria for their pre-season tour.
3 August: Dan Gosling is called up the England U17 squad for the 2007 FIFA U-17 World Cup.
3 August: Damon Lenszner resigns from the board of directors.
18 August: Ian Holloway misses the home game against Ipswich Town after being rushed to hospital with kidney stones.
21 August: Club captain Paul Wotton returns to action after nearly nine months out through injury.
15 September: Dan Gosling signs a three-year contract extension, keeping him at the club until summer 2010.
8 October: On loan defender Larrys Mabiala returns to PSG for treatment on his injured kneed.  Larrys had was still yet to make an appearance for Argyle.
19 October: Bojan Djordjic has his contract terminated with the club.
21 November: Manager Ian Holloway resigned from Plymouth Argyle, signing a contract with Leicester City F.C. days later.
27 November: Paul Sturrock is appointed manager of Plymouth Argyle for the second time.
13 December: Paul Wotton plays his first game on over a year, in a 2–0 win reserve team victory over Exeter City.
3 January: Dan Gosling's £1.5m transfer to Everton is a new club record fee received for a player.  He is also Argyle's first 1 million pound player.

Players

Squad information

Squad stats

Goalscorers

Discipline

Transfers

In

Out

Team Kit

|
|

Competitions

Overall

Results

League

Results summary

Results by round

Matches

Pre-season

References

Plymouth Argyle F.C. seasons
Plymouth Argyle